Alexandre Barros (born October 18, 1970) is a Brazilian former professional motorcycle road racer who is a 7-time 500cc/MotoGP race winner and also a race winner in Superbike World Championship. After a long Grand Prix career, in 2006 he moved to the Superbike World Championship. He returned to MotoGP for 2007, but retired by the end of the season.

Career

Early career
Barros started racing motorcycles at the age of 8, when he won on his debut in the Brazilian minibike championship. In the next two years, he was twice Brazilian moped champion. In 1981, he was the Brazilian 50cc Champion, and in 1985 he won the title of Brazilian's 250cc category. The year of 1986 saw his international début in the 80cc category—he lied about his age so he could race at the Spanish Grand Prix at the age of 15. He finished the championship in sixteenth place, scoring 6 points. In 1987, he also raced the 80cc championship, finishing seventeenth, scoring 8 points.

250cc World Championship
In 1988, Barros made his first race on the World Championship 250cc category, scoring no points. That same year, he was 3rd in the Latin American circuit of that same class. The next year, he finished 18th in the World Championship, scoring 30 points.

500cc & MotoGP World Championship

In 1990, Alex Barros was the youngest rider in history to join the top motorcycling category, the 500cc, at the age of 20. In his first year, he was 12th overall, with 57 points. Notable results included 8th in the United States and Germany, and 5th in the Belgium Grand Prix. Two years later, his first podium: a third place in the Netherlands.

The year of 1993 saw his breakthrough as he joined the Suzuki team. After qualifying third in the US Grand Prix, Barros had his first victory in Spain, finishing that year's world championship in sixth place. His teammate Kevin Schwantz was that year's champion.  The following year, Barros scored in all but one of the races. 1996 saw his best performance yet, finishing the championship at fourth, a feat he repeated in 2000, 2001 and 2002. His win at Mugello in 2001, was the latest by a rider other than Valentino Rossi until 2009. In 2002,  the first of MotoGP (with engine displacement capacity increased to up to 990cc) he scored 204 points and won races in Pacific and Valencia, eleven points behind  second place. 2003 was a difficult one for Barros due to injuries, but in 2004, he once again finished the championship in fourth, in a season dominated by Valentino Rossi, Sete Gibernau and Max Biaggi. In 2005, Barros returned to the top of the podium in Portugal, however he did not mount a lasting championship challenge, and was not offered a ride for 2006. He returned to MotoGP in 2007, riding a Ducati GP7 for Pramac d'Antin.  In pre-season testing he matched the factory Ducatis, and at midseason he was ahead of the factory rider Loris Capirossi. He came third at Mugello (ahead of Stoner) and fourth at Istanbul Park.

Superbike World Championship
For  he was hired by the Klaffi Honda team in the Superbike World Championship (WSBK), paying around £100,000 of his own money to fund the ride. After a satisfactory debut weekend with two top 10 finishes, he took a pair of podium finishes at Round 2 in Phillip Island, and a second and a fourth in round four at Monza. At Brands Hatch he failed to qualify for Superpole, but bounced back from 18th on the grid to take a pair of top 10 finishes. The wet meeting at Assen was a disappointment for Barros, especially as he is a wet-weather expert.

His season was characterised by poor starts, but despite this he ended the season as the second highest Honda rider in the championship in sixth place, behind former champion James Toseland. At Imola he took his only WSBK win, and followed it with a second place in race 2.

Suzuka 8 Hours
In 1999, Barros and Japanese teammate Tadayuki Okada won the Suzuka 8 Hours endurance race riding a Honda RC45 superbike.

Career statistics

Grand Prix motorcycle racing

By class

Races by year

Points system from 1969 to 1987:

Points system from 1988 to 1992:

Points system from 1993 onwards:

(key) (Races in bold indicate pole position; races in italics indicate fastest lap)

Superbike World Championship

By season

Races by year

(key) (Races in bold indicate pole position; races in italics indicate fastest lap)

References

External links

 Alex Barros profile on Motorcycle Racing Online
 Alex Barros bio at highrevs.net

1970 births
Living people
80cc World Championship riders
250cc World Championship riders
500cc World Championship riders
Brazilian motorcycle racers
Repsol Honda MotoGP riders
Sportspeople from São Paulo
Superbike World Championship riders
Tech3 MotoGP riders
Pramac Racing MotoGP riders
MotoGP World Championship riders